Timothy Castagne (born 5 December 1995) is a Belgian professional footballer who plays as a full-back for Premier League club Leicester City and the Belgium national team. Castagne began his senior career with Genk after graduating from the club's youth academy and moved to Leicester City in 2020.

Club career

Early career
Born in Arlon, Belgian Luxembourg, Castagne began playing football for local clubs US Waltzing and Lorrain Arlon before moving to the youth academy of Virton, the largest club in the province. He practised with the youth teams of Standard Liège after going to a boarding school in the area, but continued to play matches at Virton during the weekend.

Genk
In 2011, Castagne moved to Genk, after Standard decided not to recruit him permanently. In June 2013, he signed a professional contract for three years at Genk. In January 2014, then Genk coach Mario Been included him in training camp with the first team after leaving a good impression, which meant that he was definitively included in the first team in the second half of the season. He made his Belgian Pro League debut under new head coach Alex McLeish on 14 September 2014 as a starter against Club Brugge. On 2 May 2015, Castagne scored his first senior goal in a 7–1 home win.

Atalanta
In July 2017, he joined Serie A club Atalanta in a €6 million deal, after Andrea Conti had left Atalanta for Milan. He scored his first goal for the Bergamo team on 2 January 2018, in Coppa Italia win over Napoli.

After a first season of adaptation, his play improved in the first half of the second season, and on 27 August 2018, he scored his first goal in the Serie A in a 3–3 draw against Roma. Alternating with Hans Hateboer on the right wing-back, he scored 4 goals in the league overall; the others came in the second leg against Roma, and in two important end-of-season victories against Lazio (1–3), and Genoa (2–1).

The following year he continued to alternate with Hateboer, scoring two goals in all competitions: on 22 September 2019, he scored the equalising goal in the 95th minute against Fiorentina in a 2–2 draw, and the other in the UEFA Champions League in which he scored the first goal in a 0–3 win against Shakhtar Donetsk which allowed the Nerazzurri to advance to the round of 16.

During three years at Atalanta, Castagne made 96 appearances and scored 8 goals in all competitions. His farewell was motivated by a difficult relationship with the coach Gian Piero Gasperini.

Leicester City
On 3 September 2020, Castagne completed a move to Premier League club Leicester City on a 5-year deal. On 13 September 2020, he scored his first goal for Leicester City in a 3–0 win over West Bromwich Albion; hence, he became the fifth Belgian player to score on his Premier League debut, after Luc Nilis, Thomas Vermaelen, Christian Benteke and Leandro Trossard.

International career
Castagne made his Belgium national football team debut on 7 September 2018 in a friendly against Scotland, as a starter.

On 22 March 2019, he provided an assist for his now Leicester team mate Youri Tielemans in a 3–1 win against Russia in the UEFA Euro 2020 qualifiers.

On 12 June 2021, in the 25th minute of Belgium's opening game of the UEFA Euro 2020 against Russia, he collided head-to-head with Daler Kuzyayev. Both had to be substituted. Castagne suffered a double eye-socket fracture and had to leave the tournament.

Career statistics

Club

International

Scores and results list Belgium's goal tally first.

Honours
Leicester City
FA Cup: 2020–21

References

External links
Profile at the Leicester City F.C. website
 
 
 
 
 

1995 births
Living people
People from Arlon
Footballers from Luxembourg (Belgium)
Belgian footballers
Belgium youth international footballers
Belgium under-21 international footballers
Belgium international footballers
Association football defenders
R.E. Virton players
K.R.C. Genk players
Atalanta B.C. players
Leicester City F.C. players
Belgian Pro League players
Serie A players
Premier League players
UEFA Euro 2020 players
2022 FIFA World Cup players
Belgian expatriate footballers
Expatriate footballers in England
Expatriate footballers in Italy
Belgian expatriate sportspeople in England
Belgian expatriate sportspeople in Italy
FA Cup Final players